The 2009 Budapest City Challenge was the fifth round of the 2009 FIA GT Championship season and was organised by City Challenge GmbH. It took place at the Hungaroring, Hungary on 30 August 2009.  Michael Bartels and Andrea Bertolini won for the Vitaphone Racing Team Maserati after the disqualification of the K plus K Motorsport Saleen.  Richard Westbrook and Emmanuel Collard of Prospeed Competition won in the GT2 category by passing the AF Corse Ferrari on the final lap of the event.

Report

Qualifying
Qualifying was led by the No. 2 Vitaphone Maserati of driver Alex Müller who recorded a lap time over a tenth of a second faster than Karl Wendlinger in the K plus K Saleen.  Enrique Bernoldi, in only his second FIA GT event, qualified the Sangari Corvette on the second row alongside the third Vitaphone Maserati.

The GT2 category was led by the No. 60 Prospeed Porsche of Richard Westbrook at the end of the qualifying session but Westbrook later had his lap times excluded after the Porsche failed a stall test during technical inspection.  This promoted Álvaro Barba of No. 51 AF Corse Ferrari to his first pole position, followed by Tim Mullen's CRS Racing Ferrari.  Westbrook's exclusion demoted the Prospeed Porsche to 24th and last on the grid.

Qualifying results
Class winners are highlighted in bold.

† – The No. 60 Prospeed Competition Porsche had its qualifying times disallowed after the car failed post-qualifying technical inspection.  The No. 51 AF Corse Ferrari took over GT2 pole position.

Race

The race was led into the first turn by Enrique Bernoldi's Sangari Corvette which managed to jump from the third place grid position to first, followed by Karl Wendlinger's No. 14 K plus K Saleen and the No. 2 and No. 33 Vitaphone Maseratis.  The four held this position in the early laps but Alex Müller in the No. 2 car braked too late for the first turn at the start of the fourth lap and jumped the inside kerbs before impacting the leading Corvette and spinning in front of the second place Saleen.  This allowed the No. 33 Vitaphone car into second but Bernoldi continued to lead despite the damaged car.

This damage would however hamper the Corvette as the first pit stops took place and the Sangari Team Brazil crew had difficulties refueling the car.  The No. 1 Maserati inherited the lead following its pit stop but had to relinquish it after the team was penalized for speeding in the pit lane.  This allowed the No. 14 Saleen, now driven by Ryan Sharp, to take the lead which it held until the second round of pit stops where the No. 33 Maserati took over at the front of the field.  Karl Wendlinger returned to the cockpit and was able to overcome the deficit and retake the lead from the Maserati in the last ten minutes of the race.  On the final lap the No. 33 was passed by the No. 1 team car to complete the podium.

In the GT2 category the No. 97 Brixia Racing Porsche of Martin Ragginger led the field at the end of the first lap after passing the three Ferraris which had qualified ahead of it.  The Porsche however made its first pit stop earlier than the rest of the GT2 competitors and allowed the No. 50 AF Corse Ferrari to lead the class.  The No. 60 Prospeed Porsche of Richard Westbrook and Emmanuel Collard, which had started from last on the grid, was able to climb through the GT2 field and eventually challenge AF Corse's Gianmaria Bruni in the latter half of the race.  Westbrook was able to outbrake Bruni's Ferrari entering the first turn of the final lap and hold the lead for the rest of the lap.  The No. 77 BMS Scuderia Italia Ferrari completed the GT2 podium.

Following the race the No. 14 K Plus K Motorsports Saleen was excluded from the race after the car failed post-race technical inspection.  The car's engine did not stall as required when its air restrictors were blocked.  This promoted Bartels and Bertolini to the race win as well as Enrique Bernoldi and Roberto Streit to their first GT1 podium.  Müller was also penalized after the race for avoidable contact when he collided with the No. 8 Corvette and No. 14 Saleen, earning a five grid spot penalty for the No. 2 Vitaphone Maserati at the next FIA GT event.

Race result
Class winners in bold.  Cars failing to complete 75% of winner's distance are marked as Not Classified (NC).

References

Budapest
Budapest
Budapest